Baucke is a surname. Notable people with the surname include: 

Florian Baucke (1719–1779), Silesian and Bohemian Jesuit missionary
Johann Friedrich Wilhelm Baucke (1848–1931), New Zealand linguist, ethnologist, journalist, and interpreter

See also
Pauke
Bauke